A cubane-type cluster is an arrangement of atoms in a molecular structure that forms a cube. In the idealized case, the eight vertices are symmetry equivalent and the species has Oh symmetry. Such a structure is illustrated by the hydrocarbon cubane. With chemical formula , cubane has carbon atoms at the corners of a cube and covalent bonds forming the edges. Most cubanes have more complicated structures, usually with nonequivalent vertices. They may be simple covalent compounds or macromolecular or supramolecular cluster compounds.

Examples
Other compounds having different elements in the corners, various atoms or groups bonded to the corners are all part of this class of structures.
Inorganic cubane-type clusters include selenium tetrachloride, tellurium tetrachloride, and sodium silox.

Cubane clusters are common throughout bioinorganic chemistry. Ferredoxins containing [Fe4S4] iron–sulfur clusters are pervasive in nature. The four iron atoms and four sulfur atoms form an alternating arrangement at the corners. The whole cluster is typically anchored by coordination of the iron atoms, usually with cysteine residues. In this way, each Fe center achieves tetrahedral coordination geometry. Some [Fe4S4] clusters arise via dimerization of square-shaped [Fe2S2] precursors. Many synthetic analogues are known including heterometallic derivatives.

Several alkyllithium compounds exist as clusters in solution, typically tetramers, with the formula [RLi]4. Examples include methyllithium and tert-butyllithium. The individual RLi molecules are not observed. The four lithium atoms and the carbon from each alkyl group bonded to them occupy alternating vertices of the cube, with the additional atoms of the alkyl groups projecting off their respective corners.

Octaazacubane is a hypothetical allotrope of nitrogen with formula N8; the nitrogen atoms are the corners of the cube. Like the carbon-based cubane compounds, octaazacubane is predicted to be highly unstable due to angle strain at the corners, and it also does not enjoy the kinetic stability seen for its organic analogues.

References

Molecular geometry